The Daffodil Festival is a regional festival and royalty leadership program.  The Grand Floral Parade is held in Pierce County, Washington every April. It consists of a flower parade and a year-long royalty program to select a festival queen from one of the 23 area high schools. Each year, the Royal Court spend thousands of hours promoting education, community pride and volunteerism in the county.  In 2012, the Royal Court was named the "Official Ambassadors of Pierce County" by the County Executive and the Pierce County Council.

History
The Daffodil Festival came into existence because of the bulb industry between 1922 and 1925.  It followed a severe infestation of ‘hop lice’ that destroyed the area's hop crops and Prohibition.  The US Department of Agriculture recommended bulb planting to Valley growers because of the mildness of the climate and ideal soil conditions. The climate conditions of the Puyallup River Valley produce blooms about 2–3 weeks earlier than other areas, in plenty of time for the mid winter markets.  
The area quickly became the nations  ‘bulb basket’ producing 50% of the nations daffodil bulbs, over 50% of its bulb iris and 80% of the nations tulips. About 300 of the 12,000 varieties of daffodils were grown in the Valley. The most popular and most locally grown is the King Alfred.

Between 1928 and 1933 a Bulb Sunday and bulb banquet were held. Mr. and Mrs. Charles W. Orton hosted civic leaders from 15 towns in western Washington in 1926. In 1927 the Sumner Chamber of Commerce sponsored the first Bulb Banquet. Free daffodils were given away to visitors.  The roads became increasingly congested each year as people drove out to see the colorful fields. Reaching a peak of 30,000 vehicles.  A local photographer Lee Merrill suggested a parade be held to " take the daffodils to the people".  He organized the first event in 1934, this was the first festival as we know it today. Lee decided every festival needs a queen so as he was driving through Puyallup he saw a pretty girl and stopped and asked her if she would be the queen. Her reply "I’ll have to ask my husband". Elizabeth Lee Wotten became the first Daffodil Queen at the age of 28. She had only 4 days to find a proper gown.  She stood on a reviewing platform with her flower girl and princess to watch the parade in downtown Tacoma. Supporters of the festival included the Chambers of Commerce of Tacoma, Puyallup, and Summner. In 1937 the Daffodil Festival was made into a non-profit corporation.  Funding came from donations and the sale of memberships.

An annual event, the festival encompasses the whole of Pierce County. Originally five participating cities included Tacoma, Puyallup, Sumner, Orting and Fife joined in 1959.  The Daffodil Festival grew to become the 3rd largest floral festival in the US by the 1960s. With the exception of 2020 due to the COVID-19 pandemic and 1943-1945 due to the Second World War, the Daffodil Parade has been held each year since 1934.

The first daffodils and narcissus were planted in 1910 by George Lawler at Gardenville, now the location of the Poodle Dog Restaurant in Fife.  Many of the earliest bulbs were imported from England and the Continent, sometimes at a cost of $75 a bulb. In 1911, Lawler purchased 9000 bulbs of all varieties and kinds and hand planted them Dutch style. These plantings grew to 15 acres in North Puyallup, and finally to about 100 acres on the banks of the Nisqually River near Roy.  Other early growers were Charles and Ed Orton, Frank Chernenko, H.F. Groningen and L.M.Hatch.  The largest growers were Harold Knutson in Sumner, Van Lierop in Puyallup, and Wally Staazt at Orting. The best viewing times are from March 15- April 1.

Parade
 The Grand Floral Parade travels through Pierce County, WA, with four routes in: Tacoma, Puyallup, Sumner and Orting in one day.

Participating high schools

As of 2019, the participating high schools are:
Bethel High School (Spanaway)
Bonney Lake High School (Bonney Lake)
Chief Leschi High School (Puyallup)
Clover Park High School (Lakewood)
Curtis Senior High School (University Place)
Eatonville High School (Eatonville)
Emerald Ridge High School (Puyallup)
Fife High School (Fife)
Franklin Pierce High School (Parkland)
Graham-Kapowsin High School (Graham)
Henry Foss High School (Tacoma)
Lakes High School (Lakewood)
Lincoln High School (Tacoma)
Mt. Tahoma High School (Tacoma)
Orting High School (Orting)
Puyallup High School (Puyallup)
Rogers High School (Puyallup)
Silas High School (Tacoma)
Spanaway Lake High School (Spanaway)
Stadium High School (Tacoma)
Sumner High School (Sumner)
Washington High School (Parkland)
White River High School (Buckley)

Past Queens 
Each year in March the 23 princesses participate in the Daffodil Festival Queen's Coronation, where one of them is crowned Daffodil Festival Queen.
 
2021: Queen Katie Rose Abegglen (Puyallup) 
  2020: NO QUEEN SELECTED (due to pandemic)
  2019: Queen Katie Gilbert (White River)
  2018: Queen Allie Brooks (Lincoln)
  2017: Queen Marin Sasaki (Orting)
  2016: Queen Emily Oliver (Spanaway Lake)
  2015: Queen Ashley Becker (Bonney Lake)
  2014: Queen Marissa Modestowicz (Emerald Ridge)
  2013: Queen McKenna Erhardt (Rogers)
  2012: Queen Sarah Karamoko (Henry Foss)
  2011: Queen Claire Flemming (Curtis HS)
  2010: Queen Annie Jeong (Stadium High School)
  2009: Queen Melanie Stambaugh (Emerald Ridge)
  2008: Queen Olivia Anderson (Cascade Christian)
  2007: Queen Michell Wood (Sumner)
  2006: Queen Mollie Ruiz (Curtis)
 2005: Queen Jessica DeWitt (Mt Tahoma)
 2004: Queen Romelynn Eleno (Lakes)
 2003: Queen Angie Voiles  (Sumner)
 2002: Queen Katrina Woldseth (Franklin Pierce)
 2001: Queen Tara Faw   (Orting)
  2000: Queen Tiye Smith  Henry Foss H.S.
  1999: Queen Jeanna Little  Sumner H.S.
  1998: Queen Allison Porter   Curtis H.S
  1997: Queen Jennifer Brown  Sumner H.S.
  1996: Queen Hillary Faulk  Sumner H.S.
  1995: Queen Cynthia Gee   Henry Foss H.S.
  1994: Queen Julie Frye  Rogers H.S.
  1993: Queen Erin Haynie  Rogers H.S.
  1992: Queen Brandi Rector  Orting H.S.
  1991: Queen Ensung Kelly Nah  Wilson H.S.
  1990: Queen Kelly Parkhurst  Fife H.S.
  1989: Queen Lea Snider  Puyallup H.S.
  1988: Queen Heidi Johnson  Curtis H.S.
  1987: Queen Deborah  Harlan  Puyallup H.S.
  1986: Queen Kristin Macrander  Lakes H.S.
  1985: Queen Jaymee Marty  Clover Park H.S.
  1984: Queen Jeanette Hopkins  Gig Harbor H.S.
  1983: Queen Jeanene Dryer  Bethel H.S.
  1982: Queen Sandy Furtaw  Bethel H.S.
  1981: Queen Cindy Kovalenko  Sumner H.S.
  1980: Queen Robin Asbjorsen  Puyallup H.S.
  1979: Queen Paula Nelson  Curtis H.S.
  1978: Queen Janice Ash  Wilson H.S.
  1977: Queen Carol Glenn  Bethel H.S.
  1976: Queen Renee Hopp  Rogers H.S.
  1975: Queen Wendy Van Noy  Franklin Pierce H.S.
  1974: Queen Lori Webber  Wilson H.S.
  1973: Queen Sherri Murraey  Fife H.S.
  1972: Queen Paula Achziger  Wilson H.S.
  1971: Queen Jean Fink   Lakes H.S.
  1970: Queen Shelly Grobey  Mt Tahoma H.S.

Parades Through the Years (Themes, President, Sir Boss)

References

External links
 The Daffodil Festival Website
 Puyallup.com
 Collection of photos from the (Tacoma) News Tribune
 Pierce County resolution R2006-37 recognizing and honoring the festival and its royal court
Daffodil Festival Instagram

Tourist attractions in Pierce County, Washington
Festivals in the Puget Sound region
Parades in the United States
Puyallup, Washington
1926 establishments in Washington (state)
Festivals established in 1926
Flower festivals in the United States